Polyura delphis, the jewelled nawab, is a butterfly found in India and Southeast Asia that belongs to the rajahs and nawabs group, that is, the Charaxinae subfamily of the brush-footed butterflies family. This butterfly has multiple red spots bordered by yellow bands on a metallic white background. The wingspan is about 2.75 inches (70 mm).

See also
List of butterflies of India
List of butterflies of India (Nymphalidae)

References

External links

Polyura
Butterflies of Asia
Butterflies of Indochina
Butterflies described in 1843